Richwood Methodist Church is a historic church on Elmer Road in the Richwood section of Harrison Township, Gloucester County, New Jersey, United States.

It was built in 1860 and added to the National Register of Historic Places in 1979.

See also
National Register of Historic Places listings in Gloucester County, New Jersey
http://www.richwoodchurch.org

References

Methodist churches in New Jersey
Churches on the National Register of Historic Places in New Jersey
Churches completed in 1860
19th-century Methodist church buildings in the United States
Churches in Gloucester County, New Jersey
National Register of Historic Places in Gloucester County, New Jersey
New Jersey Register of Historic Places
Harrison Township, New Jersey